Jan Hájek was the defending champion, and he defended his title, because Radek Štěpánek retired in the final.

Seeds

Draw

Finals

Top half

Bottom half

External Links
 Main Draw
 Qualifying Draw

UniCredit Czech Open - Singles
2010 Singles